Sherman Williams House and Fruit Barn is a historic home and barn in Jerusalem, Yates County, New York.

It was listed on the National Register of Historic Places in 1994.

References

Houses on the National Register of Historic Places in New York (state)
Houses completed in 1875
Houses in Yates County, New York
Barns on the National Register of Historic Places in New York (state)
National Register of Historic Places in Yates County, New York